The 1993 Freedom Bowl was a college football bowl game between the Western Athletic Conference's Utah Utes and the Pacific 10 Conference's USC Trojans. After the Trojans jumped to a 28–0 halftime lead, the Utes shut them out in the second half, but were only able to counter with 21 points. USC won 28–21.

References

Freedom Bow
Freedom Bowl
USC Trojans football bowl games
Utah Utes football bowl games
1993 in sports in California
December 1993 sports events in the United States